A solid-state battery is a battery technology that uses solid electrodes and a solid electrolyte, instead of the liquid or polymer gel electrolytes found in lithium-ion or lithium polymer batteries.

While solid electrolytes were first discovered in the 19th century, several drawbacks have prevented widespread application. Developments in the late 20th and early 21st century have caused renewed interest in solid-state battery technologies, especially in the context of electric vehicles, starting in the 2010s.

Solid-state batteries can provide potential solutions for many problems of liquid Li-ion batteries, such as flammability, limited voltage, unstable solid-electrolyte interphase formation, poor cycling performance and strength.

Materials proposed for use as solid electrolytes in solid-state batteries include ceramics (e.g., oxides, sulfides, phosphates), and solid polymers. Solid-state batteries have found use in pacemakers, RFID and wearable devices. They are potentially safer, with higher energy densities, but at a much higher cost. Challenges to widespread adoption include energy and power density, durability, material costs, sensitivity and stability.

History 
Between 1831 and 1834, Michael Faraday discovered the solid electrolytes silver sulfide and lead(II) fluoride, which laid the foundation for solid-state ionics.

By the late 1950s, several silver-conducting electrochemical systems employed solid electrolytes, but such systems possessed undesirable qualities, including low energy density and cell voltages, and high internal resistance. In 1967, the discovery of fast ionic conduction β - alumina for a broad class of ions (Li+, Na+, K+, Ag+, and Rb+) kick-started excitement for and the development of new solid-state electrochemical devices with increased energy density. Most immediately, molten sodium / β - alumina / sulfur cells were developed at Ford Motor Company in the US, and NGK in Japan. This excitement for solid-state electrolytes manifested in the discovery of new systems in both organics, i.e. poly(ethylene) oxide (PEO), and inorganics such as NASICON. However, many of these systems commonly required operation at elevated temperatures, and / or were expensive to produce, enabling only limited commercial deployment. A new class of solid-state electrolyte developed by the Oak Ridge National Laboratory, Lithium phosphorus oxynitride (LiPON), emerged in the 1990s. While LiPON was successfully used to make thin film lithium-ion batteries, such applications were limited due to the cost associated with deposition of the thin-film electrolyte, along with the small capacities that could be accessed using the thin film format.

In 2011, the landmark work of Kamaya et al. demonstrated the first solid-electrolyte, Li1.5Al0.5Ge1.5(PO4)3 (LAGP), capable of achieving a bulk ionic conductivity in excess of liquid electrolyte counterparts at room temperature.  With this, bulk solid-ion conductors could finally compete technologically with Li-ion counterparts, leading to the modern era of solid-state research.

2000's Commercial Research & Development 

As technology advanced into the new millennium, researchers and companies in the automotive and transportation industries experienced revitalized interest in solid-state battery technologies. In 2011, Bolloré launched a fleet of their BlueCar model cars, first in cooperation with carsharing service Autolib, and later released to retail customers. The car was meant to showcase the company's diversity of electric-powered cells in the application, and featured a 30 kWh lithium metal polymer (LMP) battery with a polymeric electrolyte, created by dissolving lithium salt in a co-polymer (polyoxyethylene).

In 2012, Toyota soon followed suit and began conducting experimental research into solid-state batteries for applications in the automotive industry in order to remain competitive in the EV market. At the same time, Volkswagen began partnering with small technology companies specializing in the technology.

A series of technological breakthroughs ensued. In 2013, researchers at the University of Colorado Boulder announced the development of a solid-state lithium battery, with a solid composite cathode based on an iron-sulfur chemistry, that promised higher energy capacity compared to already-existing SSBs.

In 2017, John Goodenough, the co-inventor of Li-ion batteries, unveiled a solid-state battery, using a glass electrolyte and an alkali-metal anode consisting of lithium, sodium or potassium. Later that year, Toyota announced the deepening of its decades-long partnership with Panasonic, including a collaboration on solid-state batteries. Due to its early intensive research and coordinated collaborations with other industry leaders, Toyota holds the most SSB-related patents. However, other car makers independently developing solid-state battery technologies quickly joined a growing list that includes BMW, Honda, Hyundai Motor Company and Nissan. Other automotive-related companies, such as Spark plug maker NGK, have retrofitted their business expertise and models to cater to evolving demand for ceramic-based solid state batteries, in the face of perceived obsolescence of the conventional fossil-fuel paradigm.

Major developments continued to unfold into 2018, when Solid Power, spun off from the University of Colorado Boulder research team, received $20 million in funding from Samsung and Hyundai to establish a small manufacturing line that could produce copies of its all-solid-state, rechargeable lithium-metal battery prototype, with a predicted 10 megawatt hours of capacity per year.

QuantumScape, another solid-state battery startup that spun out of a collegiate research group (in this case, Stanford University) drew attention that same year, when Volkswagen announced a $100 million investment into the team's research, becoming the largest stakeholder, joined by investor Bill Gates. With the goal to establish a joint production project for mass production of solid-state batteries, Volkswagen endowed QuantumScape with an additional $200 million in June 2020, and QuantumScape IPO'd on the NYSE on November 29, 2020, as part of a merger with Kensington Capital Acquisition, to raise additional equity capital for the project. QuantumScape has "scheduled mass production to begin in the second half of 2024".

Qing Tao started the first Chinese production line of solid-state batteries in 2018 as well, with the initial intention of supplying SSBs for “special equipment and high-end digital products”; however, the company has spoken with several car manufacturers with the intent to potentially expand into the automotive space.

In July 2021, Murata Manufacturing announced that it will begin mass production of all-solid-state batteries in the coming months, aiming to supply them to manufacturers of earphones and other wearables.
The battery capacity is up to 25mAh at 3.8V, making it suitable for small mobile devices such as earbuds, but not for electric vehicles. Lithium-Ion cells used in electric vehicles typically offer 2,000 to 5,000 mAh at similar voltage: an EV would need at least 100 times as many of the Murata cells to provide equivalent power.

Ford Motor Company and BMW funded the startup Solid Power with $130 million, and as of 2022 the company has raised a total of $540 million.

In September 2021, Toyota announced their plan to use a solid-state battery in some future car models, starting with hybrid models in 2025, due to the cost and lower power requirements.

In January 2022,  ProLogium Technology signed a technical cooperation agreement with Mercedes-Benz, a subsidiary of the Daimler Group. The money invested by Mercedes-Benz will be used for solid-state battery development and production preparations.

In February 2022, Alpine 4 Holdings subsidiaries Elecjet and Vayu Aerospace successfully installed Solid State Batteries in their Drones leading up to a sale to a Government Contractor later in the year.
In July 2022, Svolt announced the production of a 20 Ah electric battery with an energy density of 350-400 Wh/kg.

Materials 

Solid-state electrolytes (SSEs) candidate materials include ceramics such as lithium orthosilicate, glass, sulfides and RbAg4I5. Mainstream oxide solid electrolytes include Li1.5Al0.5Ge1.5(PO4)3 (LAGP), Li1.4Al0.4Ti1.6(PO4)3 (LATP), perovskite-type Li3xLa2/3-xTiO3 (LLTO), and garnet-type Li6.4La3Zr1.4Ta0.6O12 (LLZO) with metallic Li. The thermal stability versus Li of the four SSEs was in order of LAGP < LATP < LLTO < LLZO. Chloride superionic conductors have been proposed as another promising solid electrolyte. They are ionic conductive as well as deformable sulfides, but at the same time not troubled by the poor oxidation stability of sulfides. Other than that, their cost is considered lower than oxide and sulfide SSEs. The present chloride solid electrolyte systems can be divided into two types: Li3MCl6  and Li2M2/3Cl4. M Elements include Y, Tb-Lu, Sc, and In. The cathodes are lithium based. Variants include LiCoO2, LiNi1/3Co1/3Mn1/3O2, LiMn2O4, and LiNi0.8Co0.15Al0.05O2. The anodes vary more and are affected by the type of electrolyte. Examples include In, Si, GexSi1−x, SnO–B2O3, SnS –P2S5, Li2FeS2, FeS, NiP2, and Li2SiS3.

One promising cathode material is Li-S, which (as part of a solid lithium anode/Li2S cell) has a theoretical specific capacity of 1670 mAh g−1, "ten times larger than the effective value of LiCoO2". Sulfur makes an unsuitable cathode in liquid electrolyte applications because it is soluble in most liquid electrolytes, dramatically decreasing the battery's lifetime. Sulfur is studied in solid state applications. Recently, a ceramic textile was developed that showed promise in a Li-S solid state battery. This textile facilitated ion transmission while also handling sulfur loading, although it did not reach the projected energy density. The result "with a 500-μm-thick electrolyte support and 63% utilization of electrolyte area" was "71 Wh/kg." while the projected energy density was 500 Wh/kg.

Li-O2 also have high theoretical capacity. The main issue with these devices is that the anode must be sealed from ambient atmosphere, while the cathode must be in contact with it.

A Li/LiFePO4 battery shows promise as a solid state application for electric vehicles. A 2010 study presented this material as a safe alternative to rechargeable batteries for EV's that "surpass the USABC-DOE targets".

A cell with a pure silicon μSi||SSE||NCM811 anode was assembled by Darren H.S Tan et al. using μSi anode(purity of 99.9 wt %), solid state electrolyte (SSE) and lithium nickel cobalt manganese oxide (NCM811) cathode. This kind of solid state battery demonstrated a high current density up to 5 mA cm−2, a wide range of working temperature (-20 °C and 80 °C), and areal capacity (for the anode) of up to 11 mAh cm−2 (2890 mAh/g). At the same time, after 500 cycles under 5 mA cm−2, the batteries still provide 80% of capacity retention, which is the best performance of μSi all solid-state battery reported so far.

Chloride solid electrolytes also show promise over conventional oxide solid electrolytes owing to chloride solid electrolytes having theoretically higher ionic conductivity and better formability. In addition chloride solid electrolyte’s exceptionally high oxidation stability and high ductility add to its performance. In particular a lithium mixed-metal chloride family of solid electrolytes, Li2InxSc0.666-xCl4 developed by Zhou et tal., show high ionic conductivity (2.0 mS cm−1) over a wide range of composition. This is owing to the chloride solid electrolyte being able to be used in conjunction with bare cathode active materials as opposed to coated cathode active materials and its low electronic conductivity. Alternative cheaper chloride solid electrolyte compositions with lower, but still impressive, ionic conductivity can be found with an Li2ZrCl6 solid electrolyte. This particular chloride solid electrolyte maintains a high room temperature ionic conductivity (0.81 mS cm−1), deformability, and has a high humidity tolerance.

Uses 
Solid-state batteries are potentially useful in pacemakers, RFIDs, wearable devices, and electric vehicles.

Electric vehicles 

Hybrid and plug-in electric cars use a variety of battery technologies, including Li-ion, nickel–metal hydride (NiMH), lead–acid, and electric double-layer capacitor (or ultracapacitor), with Li-ion dominating the market.
In August 2020, Toyota started road testing of their prototype vehicle, LQ Concept, equipped with a solid-state battery.
In September 2021, Toyota unveiled its strategy on battery development and supply, in which solid-state battery is to be adopted first in their hybrid electric vehicles to utilize its characteristics.
And, Honda has set their plan schedule to start operation of demonstration line for the production of all-solid-state batteries in Spring 2024.

Wearables 

The characteristics of high energy density and keeping high performance even in harsh environments are expected in realization of new wearable devices that are smaller and more reliable than ever.

Equipment in space 
In March 2021, industrial manufacturer Hitachi Zosen Corporation announced a solid-state battery they claimed has one of the highest capacities in the industry and has a wider operating temperature range, potentially suitable for harsh environments like space. A test mission was launched in February 2022, and in August, Japan Aerospace Exploration Agency (JAXA) announced  the solid-state batteries had properly operated in space, powering camera equipment in the Japanese Experiment Module Kibō on the International Space Station (ISS).

Drones 
Being lighter weight and more powerful than traditional lithium ion batteries it is resonable that Drones would benefit from Solid State batteries. Vayu Aerospace, a drone manufacturer and designer, noted an increased flight time after they incorporated them into their G1 long flight drone.

Challenges

Cost 
Thin-film solid-state batteries are expensive to make and employ manufacturing processes thought to be difficult to scale, requiring expensive vacuum deposition equipment. As a result, costs for thin-film solid-state batteries become prohibitive in consumer-based applications. It was estimated in 2012 that, based on then-current technology, a 20 Ah solid-state battery cell would cost US$100,000, and a high-range electric car would require between 800 and 1,000 of such cells. Likewise, cost has impeded the adoption of thin film solid-state batteries in other areas, such as smartphones.

Temperature and pressure sensitivity 
Low temperature operations may be challenging. Solid-state batteries historically have had poor performance.

Solid-state batteries with ceramic electrolytes require high pressure to maintain contact with the electrodes. Solid-state batteries with ceramic separators may break from mechanical stress.

In November 2022, Japanese research group, consisting of Kyoto University, Tottori University and Sumitomo Chemical, announced that they have managed to operate solid-state batteries stably without applying pressure with 230Wh/kg capacity by using copolymerized new materials for electrolyte.

Interfacial resistance 
High interfacial resistance between a cathode and solid electrolyte has been a long-standing problem for all-solid-state batteries.

Interfacial instability
The interfacial instability of the electrode-electrolyte has always been a serious problem in solid state batteries. After solid state electrolyte contacts with electrode, the chemical and/or electrochemical side reactions at the interface usually produce a passivated interface, which impedes the diffusion of Li+ across the electrode-SSE interface. Upon high-voltage cycling, some SSEs may undergo oxidative degradation.

Dendrites 

Solid lithium (Li) metal anodes in solid-state batteries are replacement candidates in lithium-ion batteries for higher energy densities, safety, and faster recharging times. Such anodes tend to suffer from the formation and the growth of Li dendrites, non-uniform metal growths which penetrate the electrolyte lead to electrical short circuits. This shorting leads to energy discharge, overheating, and sometimes fires or explosions due to thermal runaway. Li dendrites reduce coulombic efficiency.

The exact mechanisms of dendrite growth remain a subject of research. Studies of metal dendrite growth in solid electrolytes began with research of molten sodium / sodium - β - alumina / sulfur cells at elevated temperature. In these systems, dendrites sometimes grow as a result of micro-crack extension due to the presence of plating-induced pressure at the sodium / solid electrolyte interface. However, dendrite growth may also occur due to chemical degradation of the solid electrolyte.

In Li-ion solid electrolytes stable to Li metal, dendrites propagate primarily due to pressure build up at the electrode / solid electrolyte interface, leading to crack extension. Meanwhile, for solid electrolytes which are chemically unstable against their respective metal, interphase growth and eventual cracking often prevents dendrites from forming.  

Dendrite growth in solid-state Li-ion cells can be mitigated by operating the cells at elevated temperature, or by using residual stresses to fracture toughen electrolytes, thereby deflecting dendrites and delaying dendrite induced short-circuiting.

Mechanical failure 
A common failure mechanism in solid-state batteries is mechanical failure through volume changes in the anode and cathode during charge and discharge due to the addition and removal of Li-ions from the host structures.

Cathode 
Cathodes will typically consist of active cathode particles mixed with SSE particles to assist with ion conduction. As the battery charges/discharges, the cathode particles change in volume typically on the order of a few percent. This volume change leads to the formation of interparticle voids which worsens contact between the cathode and SSE particles, resulting in a significant loss of capacity due to the restriction in ion transport.

One proposed solution to this issue is to take advantage of the anisotropy of volume change in the cathode particles. As many cathode materials experience volume changes only along certain crystallographic directions, if the secondary cathode particles are grown along a crystallographic direction which does not expand greatly with charge/discharge, then the change in volume of the particles can be minimized. Another proposed solution is to mix different cathode materials which have opposite expansion trends in the proper ratio such that the net volume change of the cathode is zero. For instance, LiCoO2 (LCO) and LiNi0.9Mn0.05Co0.05O2 (NMC) are two well-known cathode materials for Li-ion batteries. LCO has been shown to undergo volume expansion when discharged while NMC has been shown to undergo volume contraction when discharged. Thus, a composite cathode of LCO and NMC at the correct ratio could undergo minimal volume change under discharge as the contraction of NMC is compensated by the expansion of LCO.

Anode 
Ideally a solid-state battery would use a pure lithium metal anode due to its high energy capacity. However, lithium undergoes a large increase of volume during charge at around 5 µm per 1 mAh/cm2 of plated Li. For electrolytes with a porous microstructure, this expansion leads to an increase in pressure which can lead to creep of Li metal through the electrolyte pores and short of the cell. Lithium metal has a relatively low melting point of 453K and a low activation energy for self-diffusion of 50 kJ/mol, indicating its high propensity to significantly creep at room temperature. It has been shown that at room temperature lithium undergoes power-law creep where the temperature is high enough relative to the melting point that dislocations in the metal can climb out of their glide plane to avoid obstacles. The creep stress under power-law creep is given by:

For lithium metal to be used as an anode, great care must be taken to minimize the cell pressure to relatively low values on the order of its yield stress of 0.8 MPa. The normal operating cell pressure for lithium metal anode is anywhere from 1-7 MPa. Some possible strategies to minimize stress on the lithium metal are to use cells with springs of a chosen spring constant or controlled pressurization of the entire cell. Another strategy may be to sacrifice some energy capacity and use a lithium metal alloy anode which typically has a higher melting temperature than pure lithium metal, resulting in a lower propensity to creep. While these alloys do expand quite a bit when lithiated, often to a greater degree than lithium metal, they also possess improved mechanical properties allowing them to operate at pressures around 50 MPa. This higher cell pressure also has the added benefit of possibly mitigating void formation in the cathode.

Advantages 
Solid-state battery technology is believed to deliver higher energy densities (2.5x).

They may avoid the use of dangerous or toxic materials found in commercial batteries, such as organic electrolytes.

Because most liquid electrolytes are flammable and solid electrolytes are nonflammable, solid-state batteries are believed to have lower risk of catching fire. Fewer safety systems are needed, further increasing energy density at the module or cell pack level. Recent studies show that heat generation inside is only ~20-30% of conventional batteries with liquid electrolyte under thermal runaway.

Solid-state battery technology is believed to allow for faster charging. Higher voltage and longer cycle life are also possible.

Thin film solid state batteries

Background 
The earliest thin film solid state batteries is found by Keiichi Kanehori in 1986, which is based on the Li electrolyte. However, at that time, the technology was insufficient to power larger electronic devices so it was not fully developed. During recent years, there has been much research in the field. Garbayo demonstrated that “polyamorphism” exists besides crystalline states for thin film Li-garnet solid state batteries in 2018, Moran demonstrated that ample can manufacture ceramic films with the desired size range of 1–20 μm in 2021.

Structure 
Anode materials: Li is favored because of its storage properties, alloys of Al, Si and Sn are also suitable as anodes.

Cathode materials: require having light weight, good cyclical capacity and high energy density. Usually include LiCoO2, LiFePO4, TiS2, V2O5and LiMnO2.

Preparation techniques 
Some methods are listed below.

 Physical methods:   
 Magnetron sputtering (MS) is one of the most widely used processes for thin film manufacturing, which is based on physical vapor deposition.
 Ion-beam deposition (IBD) is similar to the first method, however, bias is not applied and plasma doesn't occur between the target and the substrate in this process.
 Pulsed laser deposition (PLD), laser used in this method has a high power pulses up to about 108 W cm−2.
 Vacuum evaporation (VE) is a method to prepare alpha-Si thin films. During this process, Si evaporates and deposits on a metallic substrate.
 Chemical methods:
 Electrodeposition (ED) is for manufacturing Si films, which is convenient and economically viable technique.
 Chemical vapor deposition (CVD) is a deposition technique allowing to make thin films with a high quality and purity.
 Glow discharge plasma deposition (GDPD) is a mixed physicochemical process. In this process, synthesis temperature has been increased to decrease the extra hydrogen content in the films.

Development of thin film system

 Lithium-Oxygen and Nitrogen based polymer thin film electrolytes has got fully used in solid state batteries.
 Non-Li based thin film solid state batteries have been studied, such as Ag-doped germanium chalcogenide thin film solid state electrolyte system. Barium-doped thin film system has also been studied, which thickness can be 2μm at least. In addition, Ni can also be a component in thin film.
 There are also other methods to fabricate the electrolytes for thin film solid state batteries, which are 1.electrostatic-spray deposition technique, 2. DSM-Soulfill process and 3. Using MoO3 nanobelts to improve the performance of lithium based thin film solid state batteries.

Advantages 

 Compared with other batteries, the thin film batteries have both high gravimetric energy density and volumetric energy density. These are important indicators to measure battery performance of energy stored.
 In addition to high energy density, thin-film solid-state batteries have long lifetime, outstanding flexibility and low weight. These properties make thin film solid state batteries suitable for use in various fields such as electric vehicles, military facilities and medical devices.

Challenges 

 Its performance and efficiency are constrained by the nature of its geometry. The current drawn from a thin film battery largely depends on the geometry and interface contacts of the electrolyte/cathode and the electrolyte/anode interfaces
 Low thickness of the electrolyte and the interfacial resistance at the electrode and electrolyte interface affect the output and integration of thin film systems.
 During the charging-discharging process, considerable change of volumetric makes the loss of material.

See also 

 Solid-state electrolyte
 Divalent
 Fast ion conductor
 Ionic conductivity
 Ionic crystal
 John B. Goodenough
 List of battery types
 Lithium–air battery
 Lithium iron phosphate battery
 Separator (electricity)
 Supercapacitor
 Thin film lithium-ion battery

References

Further reading

External links

 
2000s introductions